Xavier Catarino Venâncio (born 29 May 1999) is a Portuguese professional footballer who plays as a midfielder for Académica de Coimbra.

Football career
On 18 September 2018, Venâncio made his professional debut with Rieti in a 2018–19 Serie C match against Matera.

References

External links

1999 births
Living people
People from Mafra, Portugal
Portuguese footballers
Association football midfielders
Association football defenders
F.C. Rieti players
Associação Académica de Coimbra – O.A.F. players
Serie C players
Liga Portugal 2 players
Portuguese expatriate footballers
Expatriate footballers in Italy
Portuguese expatriate sportspeople in Italy
Sportspeople from Lisbon District